The siege of Salvador occurred during the Brazilian War of Independence, during which the newly formed Brazilian army, under the command of French general Pierre Labatut, attempted to capture the city of Salvador in Bahia from its Portuguese defenders. The siege lasted from 2 March 1822 until 2 July 1823, finally ending when the Portuguese commander, Inácio Luís Madeira de Melo, surrendered his forces to the Brazilians.

Notes

References
 
 
 

Military history of Brazil
Military history of Portugal
Salvador
Sieges involving Brazil
Conflicts in 1822
Conflicts in 1823
1822 in Brazil
1823 in Brazil
History of Bahia
July 1823 events